Campo Largo may refer to:

 Campo Largo, Chaco, Argentina
 Campo Largo, Paraná, Brazil
 Campo Largo do Piauí, Brazil